Sandeep Madhav is an Indian actor who works in Telugu language films.

Career 
He made his acting debut with Railway Station (2012), where he played one of the lead roles. Sandeep Madhav worked as an assistant director under Jeevan Reddy for Dalam (2013). Sandeep made his lead acting debut with Ram Gopal Varma's biographical film Vangaveeti. In the film, he portrayed the roles of Vangaveeti Mohana Ranga and Vangaveeti Radha, Ranga's brother. A critic from the Deccan Chronicle wrote that "He plays the dual roles of Vangaveeti Radha and Ranga and has done a fantastic job. The two characters have distinct personalities and histories but Sandeep has pulled it off with remarkable talent". Madhav collaborated with Reddy again for George Reddy, a biographical film based on the leader of the same name. Madhav lost weight and exercised to portray George Reddy, who was a student leader and a boxer. In a review of the film by The Hindu, the critic wrote that "Sandeep Madhav leads the show; he looks and walks the part of an academically-inclined and polished student who at first glance wouldn’t be expected to throw punches".

Filmography 

All films are in Telugu, unless otherwise noted.

Awards and nominations

References

External links 

Living people
Male actors in Telugu cinema
Indian male film actors
Year of birth missing (living people)